HMS Lowestoft was a  or Type 12 class anti-submarine frigate of the British Royal Navy. Lowestoft was reconstructed in the late 1960s to largely the same pattern as the third group of s, with new radar and fire control and a hangar and pad for a Westland Wasp helicopter for longer range, anti-submarine, engagement. In the late 1970s it was converted as the prototype towed array frigate for the Royal Navy, but retained its full armament. Lowestoft was sunk as a target on 8 June 1986 by  using a Tigerfish torpedo.  She was the last Royal Naval target to be sunk still displaying her pennant number.

Design
The  was an improved version of the  anti-submarine frigate, with nine Rothesays ordered in the 1954–55 shipbuilding programme for the Royal Navy to supplement the six Whitbys.

The Rothesays were powered by the same Y-100 machinery used by the Whitby-class. Crew was about 212 officers and men.

A twin 4.5-inch (113 mm) Mark 6 gun mount was fitted forward, with 350 rounds of ammunition carried. It was originally intended to fit a twin 40 mm L/70 Bofors anti-aircraft mount aft, but in 1957 it was decided to fit the Seacat anti-aircraft missile instead. Seacat was not yet ready, and Yarmouth was completed with a single L/60 40 mm Bofors mount aft as a temporary anti-aircraft armament. The design anti-submarine armament consisted of twelve 21-inch torpedo tubes (eight fixed and two twin rotating mounts) for Mark 20E Bidder homing anti-submarine torpedoes, backed up by two Limbo anti-submarine mortars fitted aft. The Bidder homing torpedoes proved unsuccessful however, being too slow to catch modern submarines, and the torpedo tubes were soon removed.

The ship was fitted with a Type 293Q surface/air search radar on the foremast, with a Type 277 height-finding radar on a short mast forward of the foremast. A Mark 6M fire control system (including a Type 275 radar) for the 4.5-inch guns was mounted above the ship's bridge, while a Type 974 navigation radar was also fitted. The ship's sonar fit consisted of Type 174 search, Type 170 fire control sonar for Limbo and a Type 162 sonar for classifying targets on the sea floor.

Lowestoft was laid down at Alexander Stephen and Sons's Linthouse, Glasgow shipyard on 19 June 1958, was launched on 23 June 1960 and completed on 26 September 1961.

Modernisation
A hangar and flight deck was added aft to allow a Westland Wasp helicopter to be operated, at the expense of one of the Limbo anti-submarine mortars, while a Seacat launcher and the associated GWS20 director was mounted on the hangar roof. Two 20-mm cannons were added either side of the ship's bridge. A MRS3 fire control system replaced the Mark 6M, and its integral Type 903 radar allowed the Type 277 height finder radar to be removed. A Type 993 surface/air-search radar replaced the existing Type 293Q radar, while the ship's defences were enhanced by the addition of the Corvus chaff rocket dispenser.

Service
Lowestoft commissioned on 18 October 1961 and joined the 5th Frigate Squadron in March 1962. Between 1961 and 1963 she was commanded by Raymond Lygo.

In January 1971, Lowestoft joined STANAVFORLANT, the NATO Standing Naval Force Atlantic.

From October 1976 to September 1977, Lowestoft was refitted at Portsmouth for her new role as a trials ship for towed array sonar arrays. She was again refitted, at Falmouth in October 1978. In June 1982, as a result of the Falklands War, she was returned to operational service with the 7th Frigate Squadron after a short refit at Portsmouth, serving as guardship at Ascension Island.

Lowestoft was paid off at Portsmouth on 29 March 1985, and was placed on the Disposal list. Lowestoft was sunk as a target off the Bahamas on 8 June 1986.

Notes

References

Publications

External links
  HMS Lowestoft Association

 

Rothesay-class frigates
1960 ships
Ships of the Fishery Protection Squadron of the United Kingdom
Ships sunk as targets